Areare or Are'are may refer to:
ꞌAreꞌare people, an ethnic group in the Solomon Islands
ꞌAreꞌare language, a language spoken in the Solomon Islands
ꞌAreꞌare constituency, a parliamentary constituency in the Solomon Islands